Dynamix, Inc. was an American developer of video games from 1984 to 2001, best known for the flight simulator Red Baron, the puzzle game The Incredible Machine, the Front Page Sports series, Betrayal at Krondor, and the online multiplayer game Tribes.

History
The company was founded in Eugene, Oregon in 1984 by Jeff Tunnell and Damon Slye. Their first title, Stellar 7, was released before company founding and was later remade with the Dynamix name on it. They made a number of games for the Commodore 64, among them Project Firestart, which was one of the most atmospheric titles for the C64.

In the following years, Dynamix created a line of action games for Penguin Software and Electronic Arts, including one of the first games for the Amiga, Arcticfox. Later titles were developed for Activision. After self-publishing their games for a short while, in 1990 Dynamix was bought by Sierra On-Line.

Dynamix had published A-10 Tank Killer and distributed it through Mediagenic, but the acquisition occurred during the development of Red Baron, which became the first game in Dynamix's "Great Warplanes" flight simulator series published by Sierra. Dynamix created some of their most famous games, including a line of adventures and simulators that included Red Baron and The Adventures of Willy Beamish. They also created the puzzle game The Incredible Machine, along with the spinoff Sid & Al's Incredible Toons.  Another successful product line was the Front Page Sports series, designed by Pat Cook and Allen McPheeters which included Football, Baseball, and Golf. Versions of Red Baron and Front Page Sports Football were included as part of the ImagiNation Network.

As a developer, Dynamix was notable for their early use of digitized graphics, animations and sounds effects in PC, Atari ST and Amiga games. The techniques were first used in 1988 in Pete Rose Pennant Fever, and used most notably in movie tie-in games like Die Hard and Ghostbusters II, as well as David Wolf: Secret Agent and Death Track.

By 1994 Slye agreed with a Computer Gaming World statement that "Now when someone hears 'Dynamix' they immediately think 'flight simulator'". In 1994, the first game in a new series called Metaltech was released, a giant robot combat game with similarities to the BattleTech universe and games. This series resulted in two Earthsiege games and eventually Starsiege. As a side development of the Starsiege game, the successful Tribes series was created. Dynamix also created Outpost 2: Divided Destiny, the second game in Sierra's strategy/survival franchise, Outpost.

The Dynamix studio was closed by Sierra On-Line on August 14, 2001, as part of Sierra's restructuring under Vivendi Universal Interactive Publishing.  Several veterans of the studio (including Tunnell), however, stayed in Eugene and founded a new studio / electronic publisher, GarageGames.

Torque Game Engine

Some of the core Dynamix members started GarageGames, an independent-friendly engine developer and game publisher. They negotiated an agreement with Sierra for the source code to the Tribes 2 game engine. After reworking the code, GarageGames released it as a V12 but were soon told that an engine already had the name, so it was then called the Torque Game Engine (or TGE). The source code for TGE, a professional-grade 3D engine, was available to nearly anyone for fees starting at USD$100, but has since been released as open source under the MIT License.

List of games developed by Dynamix

References

External links
Official website via Internet Archive

Sierra Entertainment
1984 establishments in Oregon
2001 disestablishments in Oregon
American companies established in 1984
Video game companies established in 1984
Video game companies disestablished in 2001
Companies based in Eugene, Oregon
Defunct companies based in Oregon
Defunct video game companies of the United States
Video game development companies